Dibate is a town in western Ethiopia, named after a local tribe.

Based on figures from the Central Statistical Agency in 2005, this town has an estimated total population of 5,010 of whom 2,354 were males and were 2,656 females. According to the 1994 national census, its total population was 2,912 of whom 1,362 were males and 1,550 were females. It is the largest settlement in Dibate woreda.

Notes 

Populated places in the Benishangul-Gumuz Region